A series of four referendums on casinos and senators was held in Guam on 5 November 1996. A reduction of the number of senators from 21 to 15 passed, but proposed term limits for senators failed.  Voters approved a measure limiting the budget for parliamentary business to 2.5% of the national budget, and rejected a proposal to permit casinos to open on the island.

References

1996 referendums
1996 in Guam
Referendums in Guam